The Mesomycetozoea (or DRIP clade, or Ichthyosporea) are a small group of Opisthokonta in Eukaryota (formerly protists), mostly parasites of fish and other animals.

Significance
They are not particularly distinctive morphologically, appearing in host tissues as enlarged spheres or ovals containing spores, and most were originally classified in various groups as fungi, protozoa, or colorless algae. However, they form a coherent group on molecular trees, closely related to both animals and fungi and so of interest to biologists studying their origins. In a 2008 study they emerge robustly as the sibling-group of the clade Filozoa, which includes the animals.

Huldtgren et al., following x-ray tomography of microfossils of the Ediacaran Doushantuo Formation, has interpreted them as mesomycetozoan spore capsules.

Terminology
The name DRIP is an acronym for the first protozoa identified as members of the group,  Cavalier-Smith later treated them as the class Ichthyosporea, since they were all parasites of fish. 
 order Dermocystida
 "D": Dermocystidium. One species, Rhinosporidium seeberi, infects birds and mammals, including humans.  
 "R": the "rosette agent", now known as Sphaerothecum destruens
 order Ichthyophonida
 "I": Ichthyophonus
 "P": Psorospermium

Since other new members have been added (e.g. the former fungal orders Eccrinales and Amoebidiales), Mendoza et al. suggested changing the name to Mesomycetozoea, which refers to their evolutionary position. On Eukaryota tree, in Opisthokont clade, Mesomycetozoea is in the middle ("Meso-") of the fungi ("-myceto-") and the animals ("-zoea").  Note the name Mesomycetozoa (without a third e) is also used to refer to this group, but Mendoza et al. use it as an alternate name for basal Opisthokonts.

Phylogeny

Taxonomy
 Class Ichthyosporea Cavalier-Smith 1998
 Order Dermocystida Cavalier-Smith 1998
 Family Rhinosporidiaceae Mendoza et al. 2001
 Genus Amphibiocystidium Pascolini et al. 2003
 Genus Chromosphaera Grau-Bové et al. 2017
 Genus Dermocystidium Pérez 1908 [Amphibiothecum Feldman, Wimsatt & Green, 2005; Dermocystis Pérez 1907 non]
 Genus Dermosporidium Carini 1940
 Genus Dermotheca 
 Genus Rhinosporidium Minchin & Fantham 1905
 Genus Sphaerothecum Arkush et al. 2003 (Rosette agent)
 Genus Valentines Borteiro et al. 2018
 Order Ichthyophonida Cavalier-Smith 1998 [Ichthyophonae Mendoza et al. 2001; Amoebidiales; Eccrinales Léger & Dubosq 1929]
 Suborder Sphaeroformina Cavalier-Smith 2012
 Family Creolimacidae Cavalier-Smith 2012
 Genus Anurofeca Baker, Beebee & Ragan 1999
 Genus Creolimax Marschall et al. 2008
 Genus Sphaeroforma Jostensen et al. 2002 [Pseudoperkinsus Figueras et al. 2000]
 Family Psorospermidae Cavalier-Smith 2012
 Genus Psorospermis Cavalier-Smith 2012 [Psorospermium Hilgendorf 1883 non Eimer 1870] 
 Family Piridae Cavalier-Smith 2012
 Genus Caullerya Chatton 1907 
 Genus Abeoforma Marshall & Berbee 2011
 Genus Pirum Marshall & Berbee 2011
 Suborder Trichomycina Cavalier-Smith 2012
 Genus †Paleocadus Poinar 2016
 Family Amoebidiidae Lichtenstein 1917 ex Kirk et al. 2001
 Genus Amoebidium Cienkowski 1861
 Family Ichthyophonidae Cavalier-Smith 2012
 Genus Ichthyophonus Plehn & Mulsow 1911 
 Family Paramoebidiidae Reynolds et al. 2017
 Genus Paramoebidium Léger & Duboscq 1929
 Family Parataeniellaceae Manier & Lichtward 1968
 Genus Lajassiella Tuzet & Manier 1951 ex Manier 1968
 Genus Nodocrinella Scheer 1977
 Genus Parataeniella Poiss. 1929
 Family Eccrinaceae Leger & Duboscq 1929 [Palavasciaceae Manier & Lichtward 1968]
 Genus Alacrinella Manier & Ormières ex Manier 1968
 Genus Arundinula Léger & Duboscq 1906 [Arundinella Léger & Duboscq 1905 non Raddi 1823]
 Genus Astreptonema Hauptfleisch 1895 [Eccrinella Léger & Duboscq 1933]
 Genus Eccrinidus Manier 1970
 Genus Eccrinoides Léger & Duboscq 1929 [Eccrinopsis Léger & Duboscq 1916]
 Genus Enterobryus [Andohaheloa Manier 1955; Capillus Granata 1908; Cestodella Tuzet, Manier & Jolivet 1957; Daloala Tuzet, Manier & Vog.-Zuber 1952; Eccrina Leidy 1852; Lactella Maessen 1955; Paratrichella Manier 1947; Pistillaria Jeekel et al. 1959 non Fries 1821; Recticoma Scheer 1935; Trichella Léger & Duboscq 1929; Trichellopsis Maessen 1955]
 Genus Enteromyces Lichtwardt 1961
 Genus Enteropogon Hibbits 1979 non Nees 1836
 Genus Leidyomyces Lichtwardt et al. 1999
 Genus Palavascia Tuzet & Manier 1947 ex Lichtwardt 1964
 Genus Paramacrinella Manier & Grizel 1971
 Genus Passalomyces Lichtwardt et al. 1999
 Genus Ramacrinella Manier & Ormiéres 1962 ex Manier 1968
 Genus Taeniella Léger & Duboscq 1911
 Genus Taeniellopsis Poisson 1927

References 

 
Parasites of fish
Parasitic opisthokonts
Opisthokont classes